Ricardo Jorge Novo Nunes (born 6 July 1982), known simply as Ricardo, is a Portuguese professional footballer who plays for Varzim S.C. as a goalkeeper.

Club career
Born in Póvoa de Varzim, Ricardo joined local Varzim SC's youth system at the age of 10. He made his senior debut with amateurs Grupo Desportivo Fradelos before returning in 2003, going on to compete four seasons in the second division, the last two as first choice. In March 2006, during a match against Moreirense FC, he scored from goal to goal to give his team the win.

Ricardo moved to the Primeira Liga for 2007–08, with Académica de Coimbra. He played his first game in the competition on 24 November 2007 in a 1–3 home loss against S.L. Benfica, in what was his only appearance of the campaign. During his first years, he served as backup to Pedro Roma and Frenchman Romuald Peiser respectively, but, on 19 May 2012, started in the final of the Portuguese Cup against Sporting CP, helping to a 1–0 win for the Students first in the competition in 73 years.

In 2012–13, Ricardo became the starter under manager Pedro Emanuel. He played 37 matches in all competitions, retaining his post under new boss Sérgio Conceição.

In late May 2014, free agent Ricardo signed a three-year contract with fellow league club FC Porto. He was only third choice in his first season, and subsequently served top-tier loans at Vitória F.C. and G.D. Chaves.

Ricardo joined Chaves on a permanent three-year deal on 18 May 2017, after becoming a free agent. In August 2019, he announced he was putting his career on hold due to cancer. After surgery in September, he returned to work in December.

On 3 June 2020, Ricardo returned to Varzim after 13 years away. The following 20 March, he scored from a long clearance in a 2–0 home victory over C.D. Mafra.

HonoursAcadémica'
Taça de Portugal: 2011–12
Supertaça Cândido de Oliveira runner-up: 2012

References

External links

1982 births
Living people
People from Póvoa de Varzim
Sportspeople from Porto District
Portuguese footballers
Association football goalkeepers
Primeira Liga players
Liga Portugal 2 players
Campeonato de Portugal (league) players
Varzim S.C. players
Associação Académica de Coimbra – O.A.F. players
U.D. Leiria players
FC Porto B players
FC Porto players
Vitória F.C. players
G.D. Chaves players